The Baatuds ,  (baatud, baɣatud) are a sub-ethnic group of the Oirats. They were  a large tribe of the Oirats but the Baatuds were divided into other Oirat tribes in the 16th century. Many Baatud people were killed by the Qing dynasty army during the fall of the Dzunghar Khanate (1755-1758). Today very few Baatuds live among the Oirats.

   

Mongols
Mongol peoples
Ethnic groups in Mongolia
Kalmykia
Kalmyk people
Oirats
Dzungar Khanate